Released in 2007, Monster Ballads Xmas (also referred to as Monster Ballads Christmas) is the fourth in a series of compilation albums that features popular 80s rock bands, usually from the glam metal genre. This is the first in the series to feature a holiday theme – and the first to feature newly recorded songs.

The idea for the album came about due in part by Twisted Sister's surprising 2006 album success—A Twisted Christmas. Both albums were released by the Razor & Tie label and Twister Sister member Jay Jay French produced this album.

Track listing
 "Jingle Bells" – Skid Row – 3:02
 "Happy Xmas (War Is Over)" – Winger – 4:06
 "Have Yourself a Merry Little Christmas" – Warrant – 3:35
 "I'll Be Home for Christmas" – Twisted Sister (w/ Lita Ford) – 4:09
 "White Christmas" – Queensrÿche – 2:28
 "Run Rudolph Run" – L.A. Guns – 3:10
 "Rockin' Around the Christmas Tree" – FireHouse – 3:07
 "Naughty Naughty Christmas" – Danger Danger – 4:56
 "Blue Christmas" – Cinderella – 4:15
 "Jingle Bell Rock" – Nelson – 2:52
 "Silent Night" – Faster Pussycat – 4:13
 "Santa Claus Is Comin' to Town" – Dokken – 4:01
 "Happy Holiday" – Enuff Z'Nuff – 4:23
 "Winter Wonderland" – Stryper – 3:34
 "Christmas Love" – Billy Idol – 3:57
 "The Chipmunk Song (Christmas Don't Be Late)" (DeeTown Rock Mix) – Alvin and the Chipmunks – 2:14

Monster Ballads XMas
2007 Christmas albums
2007 compilation albums
Heavy metal Christmas albums